Joseph Palmer II (June 16, 1914 – August 15, 1994) was an American diplomat and State Department official whose career focused on U.S. relations with Africa.

Palmer entered the United States Foreign Service in 1939.  In 1941, he began a four-year tour of duty as consular officer in Nairobi.  He then served as assistant chief of the African division of the State Department in Washington, 1945–49.  He held various diplomatic positions in Africa throughout the 1950s.

In 1960, following agitation by Nigerian nationalists, the British Empire relinquished its control over Colonial Nigeria and Nigeria entered the Commonwealth of Nations as an independent nation on October 1, 1960. In preparation for Nigerian independence, on September 23, 1960, President Dwight D. Eisenhower appointed Palmer as the United States' first Ambassador to Nigeria. Palmer established the American embassy in Lagos on October 1, 1960, and presented his credentials to the Government of Nigeria three days later. The official Declaration of Independence was signed in the main boardroom of the Federal Palace Hotel in Lagos. When the Nigerian First Republic was proclaimed in October 1963, Palmer was re-accredited, presenting his new credentials to the government on December 12, 1963. Palmer's tenure as Ambassador to Nigeria ended on January 16, 1964.

President Lyndon B. Johnson appointed Palmer as Director General of the Foreign Service on February 16, 1964, and Palmer served in this capacity until April 10, 1966.

On April 1, 1966, President Lyndon B. Johnson appointed Palmer as the third U.S. Assistant Secretary of State for African Affairs.  He served in this post until July 7, 1969.

The next day, he took up his position as the U.S. Ambassador to the Kingdom of Libya, having been appointed by President Richard Nixon. Palmer was present in Libya on September 1, 1969, when a group of military officers led by Muammar al-Gaddafi staged a coup d’état against King Idris while he was in Turkey for medical treatment. After the 1969 coup, Gaddafi closed American and British bases and partially nationalized foreign oil and commercial interests in Libya. Gaddafi's anti-American attitude and his support of international terrorism led the United States to recall Ambassador Palmer on November 7, 1972.

References

External links
 Investment Guarantee Agreement Between the United States and Nigeria, signed by Ambassador Palmer in 1962
 Photo in the Jan. 1965 issue of The Rotarian shows Palmer being presented with a medal from the Rotary Club of Lagos
 Photo in the Sept. 1965 issue of Negro World show Palmer congratulating Howard Thurman on his retirement
 Spread in Oct. 1968 Ebony magazine contains photo of Ambassador Palmer speaking with Zambian diplomats

1914 births
1994 deaths
Ambassadors of the United States to Libya
Assistant Secretaries of State for African Affairs
Ambassadors of the United States to Nigeria
American expatriates in Kenya
Directors General of the United States Foreign Service
Harvard College alumni
Georgetown University alumni
United States Foreign Service personnel
20th-century American diplomats